SciLands is an area within the virtual world Second Life devoted to science and technology. Member organizations share borders of their individual regions to create a larger virtual continent.  The goal is to foster conversations and ideas that might not have occurred in each region been separate.  Other goals include increasing visitor traffic and making it easier to find useful educational content within Second Life.

SciLands members have regular meetings in Second Life where they share ideas, help each other, vote on new membership, and plan future projects. Members also share resources such as meeting spaces and developers.

SciLands was initially formed around the International Spaceflight Museum and NASA CoLab. Since its establishment, it has grown to host a variety of other organizations including government agencies, universities, and museums.

Highlighted content

General

Nanotechnology
Genetics
Science School I, II, III

Space

Rocket Ride to Space
Virtual Planetarium
Solar System Tour
Apollo 11 Landing Site on the Moon
Real-time Satellite Positions
Martian Dust Storms

Health science
Visualizing Future Healthcare Options for London (Imperial College London)

Member organizations

See also
Second Life
NOAA

References

External links 
Archived version of the official site
SciLands Flickr Photo Pool
NOAA Island Tour Video
NOAA's Science On a Sphere Program
International Spaceflight Museum

Second Life